Rafael Ernesto Castellín García (born 2 September 1975) is a retired Venezuelan footballer.

International career
Castellín made 22 appearances for the senior Venezuela national football team.

International goals

|-
| 1. || September 18, 1996 || Cuscatlán, San Salvador, El Salvador ||  || 0–1 || 0-1 || Friendly
|-
| 2. || April 2, 1997 || Centenario, Montevideo, Uruguay ||  || 2–1 || 3-1 || 1998 FIFA World Cup qualification
|-
| 3. || May 31, 2000 || Pueblo Nuevo, San Cristóbal, Venezuela ||  || 1–0 || 3-1 || Friendly
|-
| 4. || May 31, 2000 || Pueblo Nuevo, San Cristóbal, Venezuela ||  || 2–1 || 3-1 || Friendly
|-
| 5. || August 18, 2004 || Estadio de Gran Canaria, Las Palmas, Spain ||  || 3–2 || 3-2 || Friendly
|}

References

 
 FIFA profile

1975 births
Living people
People from Maturín
People from Monagas
Venezuelan footballers
Venezuela international footballers
1997 Copa América players
Association football forwards
Venezuelan Primera División players
Monagas S.C. players
Minervén S.C. players
Caracas FC players
Deportivo Italia players
UA Maracaibo players
Real Esppor Club players
Asociación Civil Deportivo Lara players
20th-century Venezuelan people